Haymarket Square may refer to:

 Haymarket Square (Boston), in Boston

 Haymarket Square (Chicago), in Chicago
 Haymarket affair, a labor demonstration in Chicago at Haymarket Square in 1886

 Haymarket Square (band), a Chicago-based psychedelic rock band